MEGA Maldives Airlines was a Maldivian airline based at Ibrahim Nasir International Airport. It suspended all operations on 2 May 2017.

History
Mega Maldives was awarded an AOC on 22 December 2010, and its first domestic flight was from Malé to Gan on 28 December 2010. The airline began its international operations on 21 January 2011 between Hong Kong and Gan. The airline initially operated flights between Hong Kong and Gan once every 5 days. Later, the route was changed to Hong Kong and Malé, but continued the unique every 5 day pattern. The airline also began scheduled service from Malé to Shanghai on 16 July and to Beijing 22 July 2011.

Frequencies have increased since 2011 and the airline currently operates 4 to 5 flights a week to each of Beijing, Shanghai, and Hong Kong depending on the season. The airline has also served Chongqing, Chengdu, and Hangzhou, China as well as Incheon (Seoul), Korea, with seasonal services. The latest route to operate is from Hong Kong to Koror, Palau with twice-weekly frequencies starting in mid-December, 2013.

The airline also provides technical services to other airlines at Male' Ibrahim Nasser International Airport including AOG support. The airline can also provide ground handling supervision and permit management services to other foreign airlines as well. The corporate headquarters of MEGA Maldives Airlines is located in Male', Maldives.

In September 2016, MEGA Maldives announced it would cut 65 of its 400 staff as well as postponing planned new routes until further notice due to the severely decreased Chinese leisure market. In the same month, the airline introduced its first Boeing 737-800 on wet-lease from Travel Service. The aircraft is part of its fleet modernization program and will be used for increased connectivity between short and medium ranged destinations, notably opening up new destinations in India and Sri Lanka.

Mega Maldives suspended all remaining operations on 12 May 2017 stating restructuring measures. Beforehand, it already significantly reduced its network down to only two Chinese destinations.

Destinations
Prior to the suspension of all operations, MEGA Maldives operated scheduled and charter flights to the following destinations:   
Bangladesh
Chittagong - Shah Amanat International Airport
Dhaka - Hazrat Shahjalal International Airport
Sylhet - Osmani Airport
Mauritious 
Port Louis - Sir Seewoosagur Ramgoolam International Airport                                    
Sri Lanka
Colombo - Bandaranaike International Airport
Hong Kong SAR
 Hong Kong - Hong Kong International Airport
India
 Delhi - Indira Gandhi International Airport
 Mumbai - Chhatrapati Shivaji Maharaj International Airport
Japan
 Tokyo - Narita International Airport
South Korea
 Incheon - Seoul-Incheon International Airport
Saudi Arabia
 Dammam - King Fahd International Airport
 Jeddah - King Abdulaziz International Airport
 Medina - Prince Mohammad bin Abdulaziz International Airport
 Riyadh - King Khalid International Airport
Maldives
 Malé – Velana International Airport base
 Addu Atoll - Gan International Airport secondary base, charter
Macau
 Macau-Taipa - Macau International Airport
Malaysia
 Kuala Lumpur-Sepang - Kuala Lumpur International Airport
Oman
 Muscat - Muscat International Airport
Palau
 Koror-Airai - Roman Tmetuchl International Airport
United Arab Emirates
 Abu Dhabi - Abu Dhabi International Airport
 Dubai - Dubai International Airport
People's Republic of China
Beijing – Beijing Capital International Airport
Chengdu - Chengdu Shuangliu International Airport
Chongqing - Chongqing Jiangbei International Airport
Hangzhou – Hangzhou Xiaoshan International Airport
Shanghai – Shanghai Pudong International Airport
Zhengzhou – Zhengzhou Xinzheng International Airport
Changsha – Changsha Huanghua International Airport
Xi’an – Xi'an Xianyang International Airport

Fleet

Prior to operational suspension. MEGA Maldives' fleet consisted of the following aircraft:

References

Citations

Bibliography

External links

 

Defunct airlines of the Maldives
Airlines established in 2010
Airlines disestablished in 2017
2010 establishments in the Maldives
2017 disestablishments in Asia